Gbledi-Gborgame is a town in the Volta Region of Ghana. The town is known for the Afadjato Secondary Technical School.  The school is a second cycle institution.

References

Populated places in the Volta Region